The 1904 Chicago Maroons football team was an American football team that represented the University of Chicago during the 1904 Western Conference football season.  In their 13th season under head coach Amos Alonzo Stagg, the Maroons compiled a 10–1–1 record, finished in third place in the Western Conference with a 5–1–1 record against conference opponents, and outscored all opponents by a combined total of 410 to 44.

Schedule

Roster

Head coach: Amos Alonzo Stagg (13th year at Chicago)

References

Chicago
Chicago Maroons football seasons
Chicago Maroons football